C. maculata may refer to:

 Cadphises maculata, a Southeast Asian moth
 Caecula maculata, a worm eel
 Caledopteryx maculata, a flatwing damselfly
 Callista maculata, a Venus clam
 Callyspongia maculata, a multicellular organism
 Caloenas maculata, an extinct pigeon
 Calophaena maculata, a ground beetle
 Calophya maculata, a psyllid bug
 Caloplaca maculata, a lichen-forming fungus
 Calopteryx maculata, a broad-winged damselfly
 Calyce maculata, a tumbling flower beetle
 Campylaspis maculata, a crustacean with no free telson
 Canna maculata, a perennial plant
 Canthidermis maculata, an ocean triggerfish
 Cephetola maculata, an African butterfly
 Caridina maculata, an atyid shrimp
 Ceropales maculata, a spider wasp
 Channa maculata, a snakehead native to Asia
 Chimaphila maculata, an evergreen herb
 Chimonobambusa maculata, an evergreen plant
 Chlamydera maculata, an Australian bowerbird
 Chloroclystis maculata, a New Zealand moth
 Chrysasura maculata, a New Guinean moth
 Chrysometa maculata, a long-jawed orb weaver
 Chusquea maculata, a South American mountain bamboo
 Cicuta maculata, a plant native to North America
 Clavelina maculata, a marine animal
 Clemensia maculata, a Peruvian moth
 Clubiona maculata, a leafcurling sac spider
 Coladenia maculata, an African butterfly
 Coleomegilla maculata, a coccinellid beetle
 Columnea maculata, a flying goldfish plant
 Comatella maculata, a feather star
 Commelina maculata, a herbaceous plant
 Conioscinella maculata, a grass fly
 Corallorhiza maculata, a coralroot orchid
 Cordulegaster maculata, a flying adder
 Coremecis maculata, a geometer moth
 Coryanthes maculata, a South American orchid
 Corymbia maculata, a tree endemic to Australia
 Coryza maculata, a ground beetle
 Cotinga maculata, a bird endemic to southeastern Brazil
 Cranchia maculata, a glass squid
 Crenicichla maculata, a cichlid native to South America
 Crepidula maculata, a sea snail
 Crocosmia maculata, an iris native to South Africa
 Crypsotidia maculata, an owlet moth
 Cryptostylis maculata, a tongue orchid
 Cteniloricaria maculata, an armored catfish
 Cyclopia maculata, a legume endemic to South Africa
 Cypraea maculata, a sea snail